Sergei Aleksandrovich Kudryavtsev (1903 – April 25, 1938) was a Ukrainian Soviet politician and statesman. He was born in Kharkiv. During the Great Purge, he was arrested on October 13, 1937 and later executed by firing squad. After the death of Joseph Stalin, he was rehabilitated in 1956.

Bibliography 
 Przewodnik po historii Partii Komunistycznej i ZSRR (ros.)
 http://www.alexanderyakovlev.org/almanah/almanah-dict-bio/1006037/9 (ros.)
 http://www.sakharov-center.ru/asfcd/martirolog/?t=page&id=8273 (ros.)

1903 births
1938 deaths
Politicians from Kharkiv
People from Kharkov Governorate
Ukrainian communists
Soviet politicians
Politburo of the Central Committee of the Communist Party of Ukraine (Soviet Union) members
Great Purge victims from Ukraine
People executed by firing squad